Graincourt-lès-Havrincourt is a commune in the Pas-de-Calais department in the Hauts-de-France region of France.

Geography
The A26 autoroute junction with the A2 autoroute is only half a mile from the commune.

Population

Places of interest
 The church of St.Martin, rebuilt along with the rest of the village after World War I.
 The Commonwealth War Graves Commission cemetery.

See also
Communes of the Pas-de-Calais department

References

External links

 “Sucrerie” CWGC cemetery
 “Sanders Keep” CWGC cemetery

Graincourtleshavrincourt